IUH may refer to:

 Inverted-U hypothesis of Somatic anxiety
 Industrial University of Ho Chi Minh City